Typhoon Robyn, known in the Philippines as Typhoon Openg, was a mid-season tropical cyclone that brushed Japan during August 1993. Typhoon Robyn originated from a near equatorial monsoon trough in the eastern Caroline Islands in late July. Tracking west-northwest, a tropical depression developed on August 1, and became a tropical storm the next day. Following an increase in organization, Robyn obtained typhoon intensity on August 5. The typhoon briefly tracked west before veering to the northwest while intensifying. After passing through the Ryukyu Islands, Robyn skirted past western Kyushu on August 9 while steadily weakening. Midday on August 10, Robyn lost typhoon intensity over the Sea of Japan. The next day, the system was declared an extratropical cyclone.

In advance of the storm, 5,300 individuals were evacuated from Nagasaki Prefecture. Around 100 flights in and out of Kagoshima Airport were called off. Throughout Japan, nine people were killed, and fifty others were wounded. A total of 564 structures were destroyed, 80 homes were damaged, 220 houses were flooded, roads were cut in 15 locations, and two dikes were ruined. On the island of Kyushu, over 10,000 people fled their homes and around 285,000 households lost electricity. Damage in the country totaled ¥10.3 billion, equal to US$92.3 million. In South Korea, 45 people were killed and damage was estimated at US$86 million. The remnants of the storm also dropped rainfall across the Russian Far East.

Meteorological history

The sixth and final tropical cyclone of July, Robyn originated from a near equatorial monsoon trough in the eastern Caroline Islands. At 06:00 UTC on July 30, the Joint Typhoon Warning Center (JTWC) started watching the system as thunderstorm activity had persisted as the disturbance tracked west-northwest. On the afternoon on July 31, a Tropical Cyclone Formation Alert was issued, following reports from Hurricane Hunters that a low-level center was forming. At 06:00 UTC on August 1, the Japan Meteorological Agency (JMA) upgraded the system into a tropical depression. Based on Dvorak classifications of T1.5/, the JTWC followed suit several hours later. Both the JTWC and JMA upgraded the depression into Tropical Storm Robyn at 06:00 UTC on August 2, with the JTWC citing Dvorak estimates of T2.5/ as the reason for the upgrade.

Initially, Tropical Storm Robyn meandered erratically within a mesoscale convective system. At noon on August 3, the JMA upgraded Robyn into a severe tropical storm. Banding features increased in coverage that afternoon as the storm itself slowed down. Robyn then began to cease all westward movement and instead took a dive south, only to turn north and later northwest. According to the JMA, Robyn leveled off in intensity for 30 hours, and did not become a typhoon until noon on August 5. The JMA disagrees, noting that only slight intensification occurred during this period. Starting late on August 7, the JTWC estimated that Robyn began a weakening trend, although according to the JMA, Robyn maintained its intensity through August 8, with its pressure further dropping to  After passing through the Ryukyu Island, Robyn skirted past western Kyushu on August 9 while steadily weakening. Midday on August 10, both the JTWC and JMA agreed that Robyn lost typhoon intensity over the Sea of Japan. The next day, both the JTWC and JMA classified the system as an extratropical cyclone.

Impact

Japan
In Nagasaki Prefecture, about 5,300 people were evacuated from their homes at the foot of the Mount Unzen volcano due to fear of landslides. Under the anticipation of rough weather, about 100 flights out of Kagoshima Airport were canceled, with airports in numerous other prefectures also suspending flights. The Kadena Air Base was evacuated at 03:00 UTC on August 8. Starting on August 9, all bullet train services between Hakata and Hiroshima were suspended.

In addition to being one of three tropical cyclones to hit both Okinawa and Sasebo in 1993, the cyclone dropped heavy rainfall across much of the Japanese archipelago, which was already deluged by previous floods that killed over 40 people. A ship offshore Sasebo measured a minimum sea level pressure . Overall, nine people were killed, and fifty others were wounded. A total of 564 structures were destroyed, 80 homes were damaged, 220 houses were flooded, roads were cut in 15 locations, and 2 dikes were ruined. On the island of Kyushu alone, over 10,000 people fled their homes. Around 285,000 households lost electricity. Nationwide, damage was estimated at ¥10.3 billion or US$92.3 million.

Across Okinawa, 32 households lost power. A total of  crops were damaged, amounting to ¥106 million. In Ehime Prefecture, 13,316 homes lost electricity. A total of 18 homes were damaged, and roads were damaged in 121 locations. Twenty-two flights were delayed in the prefecture due to strong winds. Damage was estimated at ¥1.56 billion. In Miyazaki Prefecture, 406 homes were destroyed and 321 others were damaged. Three people were killed in the prefecture, including two Ebino – one due to a landslide and another due to a house collapsing. Thirteen people were wounded, including eleven in the northern portion of the prefecture. In the city of Kagoshima, 100 households lost power. Five people perished in the backyard of a private house in Tarumizu. Throughout Kagoshima Prefecture, 325 homes were destroyed, 23 homes were damaged, and 14 individuals were wounded. Damage there amounted to ¥2.35 billion, mostly from the fishing and agriculture industries. An Indonesian sailor from the  Opo Soly was reported missing after his freighter tried to dock offshore Kagoshima Prefecture, although 13 others on board were rescued safely. Overall, five were presumed dead in Kagoshima Prefecture after a landslide buried all five family members under mud. Nearly 11,000 households were left without power in Amakusa. Crop damage in Kumamoto Prefecture was estimated at ¥2.67 billion. Eight people suffered injuries in Nagasaki Prefecture and damage there was estimated at ¥2.94 billion.

Roughly 30,000 people lost power due to downed trees in the city of Ōita. Damage in Ōita Prefecture amounted to ¥1.32 billion. A high school pupil was wounded in Imari while a 38-year-old in Karatsu was severely injured. Damage in Saga Prefecture was estimated at ¥427 million. Damage in Fukuoka Prefecture was estimated at ¥394 million and two people sustained injured in the prefecture. Eighteen landslides occurred in Hyōgo Prefecture. Crop damage in Okayama Prefecture was estimated at ¥90 million. One person was hurt in Hiroshima Prefecture and damage there was estimated at ¥233 million. Damage in Yamaguchi Prefecture was estimated at ¥835 million. Five people, including three seniors and one child, were injured in the prefecture due to strong winds, which also resulted in 46,000 customers losing power. Strong winds damaged 24 municipalities in Tottori Prefecture. There, one person was injured and damage was estimated at ¥149 million. As a result of rough weather conditions, 13 flights were cancelled at the Miho-Yonago Airport. The extratropical remnants of the storm dropped heavy rainfall on the northernmost island of Hokkaido.

Elsewhere
Taegwalli Station received  in a 24-hour period; this total was double the amount of rainfall typically observed in August. Meanwhile, Gangneung observed  in separate 24 hour spans. A total of 45 people were killed in the country, including 39 in automobile traffic related deaths. One man was killed due to high winds in Pusan while at least three others were presumed dead across the southern portion of the country. The extratropical remnants of Robyn later dropped  in Vladivostok, part of the Russia Far East.

See also

Typhoon Zola (1990) – similar early-season Western Pacific tropical storm that struck Japan

Notes

References

R
R
R